Logan Century Center 1 is a -tall supertall skyscraper in Nanning, China. Construction started in 2013 and was completed in 2018.

See also
List of tallest buildings in China

References

Buildings and structures under construction in China
Skyscrapers in Nanning
Skyscraper office buildings in China
Skyscraper hotels in China